Bikorn Lake is the lake occupying most of the interior of Treklyano Island off the northeast coast of Robert Island in the South Shetland Islands, Antarctica. It extends 205 m in west-northwest to east-southeast direction and 137 m in south–north direction, with a surface area of 1.46 ha, and is separated from the waters of Nelson Strait by a 21 to 70 m wide strip of land. The area was visited by early 19th century sealers.

The feature is so named because of its shape supposedly resembling a bicorne hat ('bikorn' in Bulgarian).

Location
British mapping of the area in 1968 and Bulgarian in 2009.

Maps
 Livingston Island to King George Island. Scale 1:200000. Admiralty Nautical Chart 1776. Taunton: UK Hydrographic Office, 1968
 South Shetland Islands. Scale 1:200000 topographic map No. 3373. DOS 610 - W 62 58. Tolworth, UK, 1968
 L.L. Ivanov. Antarctica: Livingston Island and Greenwich, Robert, Snow and Smith Islands. Scale 1:120000 topographic map. Troyan: Manfred Wörner Foundation, 2009. 
 Antarctic Digital Database (ADD). Scale 1:250000 topographic map of Antarctica. Scientific Committee on Antarctic Research (SCAR). Since 1993, regularly upgraded and updated

Notes

References
 Bulgarian Antarctic Gazetteer. Antarctic Place-names Commission. (details in Bulgarian, basic data in English)

External links
 Bikorn Lake. Adjusted Copernix satellite image

Lakes of the South Shetland Islands
Bulgaria and the Antarctic